Tracked is a 1928 American silent Western film directed by Jerome Storm and starring Sam Nelson and Caryl Lincoln. A sheepdog is wrongly accused of being a sheep-killer.

Cast
 Ranger the Dog as Lobo 
 Sam Nelson as Jed Springer 
 Caryl Lincoln as Molly Butterfield 
 Albert J. Smith as Lem Hardy
 Jack Henderson as The Rustler 
 Art Robbins as The Herder 
 Clark Comstock as Nathan Butterfield

References

Bibliography
 Langman, Larry. A Guide to Silent Westerns. Greenwood Publishing Group, 1992.

External links
 

1928 films
1928 Western (genre) films
American black-and-white films
Films directed by Jerome Storm
Film Booking Offices of America films
Silent American Western (genre) films
1920s English-language films
1920s American films